Lincoln Building may refer to:

Lincoln Building (42nd Street, Manhattan)
Lincoln Building (Union Square, Manhattan), listed on the NRHP
Lincoln Building (Carrington, North Dakota), listed on the NRHP
Lincoln Building (Champaign, Illinois), listed on the NRHP
Lincoln Building (Little Rock, Arkansas), listed on the NRHP